Armbro Nesbit (1970–1977) was a champion Standardbred pacing horse, raised in Ontario, Canada. He raced for three years, earning $625,964 and retired with 35 wins, 12 seconds and 11 thirds in 76 starts.

Armbro Nesbit was inducted into the Canadian Horse Racing Hall of Fame in 1977.

References
 Armbro Nesbit's page at the Canadian Horse Racing Hall of Fame

See also
Harness racing

1970 racehorse births
1977 racehorse deaths
Canadian Standardbred racehorses
Canadian Horse Racing Hall of Fame inductees